The 1974 CONCACAF Youth Tournament was held in Canada.

Teams
The following teams entered the tournament:

Group stage

Group A

Group B

Group C

Play-off round
Mexico achieved the best score and apparently moved straight to the final. The other two winners Cuba and Trinidad and Tobago first had to play each other for the other final spot.

Play-off for final

Final

Discrepancies
The above results are based on the official account from the CONCACAF. However, RSSSF also reports on the tournament, with (very) different results. The tournament format is different, some scores are, as well as match dates.

References

CONCACAF Under-20 Championship
1974 in youth association football